Maria of Aragon (29 June 1482 – 7 March 1517) was Queen of Portugal as the second spouse of King Manuel I, the widower of her elder sister Isabella.

Life

Early life
Maria was born at Córdoba on 29 June 1482 as the third surviving daughter of Isabella I of Castile and Ferdinand II of Aragon (the Catholic monarchs). She was the fourth of their five surviving children, and had a stillborn twin (the sources differ on the gender of Maria's twin).  Like her sisters, she was given a thorough education, not only in household tasks but also in arithmetic, Latin, several other languages, history, philosophy and the classics.

Marriage
As an infanta of Spain, her hand in marriage was important in European politics.  Before her marriage to Manuel I of Portugal, her parents entertained the idea of marrying her to King James IV of Scotland. This was at a time when her younger sister Catherine's marriage to Arthur, Prince of Wales, was being planned. Ferdinand and Isabella thought if Maria was Queen of Scotland, the two sisters could keep the peace between their husbands. These plans, however, came to nothing. Her eldest sister Isabella, Princess of Asturias, was the first wife of Manuel I, but her death in 1498 created a necessity for Manuel to remarry; Maria became the next bride of the Portuguese king, reaffirming dynastic links with Spanish royal houses.

Manuel and Maria were married in Alcácer do Sal on 30 October 1500, and Maria was granted Viseu and Torres Vedras as her dower. She had 10 children, eight of whom reached adulthood, including King John III of Portugal, Holy Roman Empress Isabella, and Beatrice, Duchess of Savoy.

Queen
Queen Maria was described as pale and thin to her exterior, with a retiring chin, and had a very serious character to her personality. Despite the fact that she was queen during a famous time period in Portuguese history, when the Portuguese court was one of the richest in Europe, she did not play any significant part as an individual.  Serious and pious, she devoted her time to sewing, pious devotion and supervising the education of her children in accordance with the principles of her parents.  She maintained a close correspondence with her parents, got along well with her sister-in-law Isabel and the queen dowager Beatrice, and hosted a large court with both Spanish and Portuguese ladies-in-waiting.  King Manuel appreciated her pious nature, treated her with respect and awarded her with expensive clothes and jewelry during her pregnancies.

Queen Maria was not described as politically active, though chronicles praised her for occasionally persuading her husband to an act of mercy.  She was, however, somewhat involved in religious politics.  She supported King Manuel's religious-imperial project, including the plan to conquer the Mamluk's realm, destroy Mecca and Medina and reconquer Christian holy places such as Jerusalem.  She co-founded the Jeronimos Monastery in Lisbon.

During her life in Portugal, Maria was almost continually pregnant. Normally, she had but a few months pause between a delivery and her next pregnancy.  This state of affairs resulted in a continual deterioration of her health and after the delivery of 1516, she was reportedly exhausted to a point that she was also temporarily mentally confused before she recuperated. She died in Lisbon on 7 March 1517, and was buried at the Jerónimos Monastery of Belém.

Legacy
In 1580, the dynastic links from the marriage led to a succession crisis in Portugal that made her grandson Philip II of Spain king of Portugal as Philip I of Portugal.

Ancestry

Children
Her marriage with Manuel produced the following children:

Her widowed husband later married a third time, in 1518, also this time from her family: Maria's niece Eleanor of Austria.

Notes

References

Sources

 Serrano, Joana Bouza. Maria de Castela (1482–1517): uma rainha do Renascimento. In: As avis: as grandes rainhas que partilharam o trono de Portugal na segunda dinastia. 2ª ed. Lisboa: A Esfera dos Livros, 2009

|-

1482 births
1517 deaths
Portuguese queens consort
Aragonese infantas
Castilian infantas
Maria
Maria
Spanish Roman Catholics
Portuguese Roman Catholics
Spanish people of Italian descent
Spanish people of Portuguese descent
Spanish people of English descent
Spanish people of French descent
15th-century Spanish people
16th-century Spanish people
15th-century Portuguese people
16th-century Portuguese people
15th-century Spanish women
16th-century Spanish women
15th-century Portuguese women
16th-century Portuguese women
Deaths in childbirth
Daughters of kings